The 2019 Virginia Tech Hokies football team represented Virginia Tech during the 2019 NCAA Division I FBS football season. The Hokies were led by fourth-year head coach Justin Fuente and played their home games at Lane Stadium in Blacksburg, Virginia. They competed as members of the Coastal Division of the Atlantic Coast Conference (ACC).
The Hokies lost to arch rival Virginia for the first time since 2003. The loss cost the Hokies the Coastal Division and a trip to the Orange Bowl.

Preseason

Preseason media poll
In the preseason ACC media poll, Virginia Tech was predicted to finish in third in the Coastal Division.

Schedule
In non-conference play, Virginia Tech played home games against Old Dominion of Conference USA, Furman of the Southern Conference, and Rhode Island of the Colonial Athletic Association, as well as a road game against Notre Dame, a football independent. In ACC play, the Hokies will play the other members of the Coastal Division as well as Boston College and Wake Forest from the Atlantic Division.

Source:

Personnel

Game summaries

at Boston College

Old Dominion

Furman

Duke

at Miami (FL)

Rhode Island

North Carolina

Starting with the 2019 season, every overtime period starting with the fifth overtime consists solely of one two-point attempt per team from the three yard line.

at Notre Dame

After poor performances against USC and Michigan, Notre Dame stepped up defensively against Virginia Tech.  The hokies were held to their lowest total yards game since 2015 and lowest yards per play since 2016 in what was billed as "one of the best group effort performances" ever seen by Sports Illustrated sportswriter Bryan Driskell.  Yet, Notre Dame still needed a late touchdown to win the game by a final score 21-20 and Notre Dame extended their home winning streak to 16 games.

Wake Forest

at Georgia Tech

Pittsburgh

at Virginia

vs Kentucky (Belk Bowl)

Honorary #25 Beamer Jersey 
Since the start of the 2016 season, during the week before each game, Head Coach Justin Fuente selects an outstanding player to wear the #25 jersey in honor of former head coach, Frank Beamer, who wore #25 as a player for Virginia Tech. The jersey represents hard work, toughness, good sportsmanship and being a exemplary teammate. At first, the distinction was intended strictly for special teams players, but has since been expanded to include all team members.

The players honored in the 2019 season are:

Rankings

Players drafted into the NFL

References

Virginia Tech
Virginia Tech Hokies football seasons
Virginia Tech Hokies football